The following are the ranks and insignia of NATO Air Forces Enlisted personnel for each member nation.

Other Ranks (OR 1–9)

See also 
 NATO
 Ranks and insignia of NATO
 Ranks and insignia of NATO armies enlisted
 Ranks and insignia of NATO armies officers
 Ranks and insignia of NATO air forces officers
 Ranks and insignia of NATO navies enlisted
 Ranks and insignia of NATO navies officers

Notes

References

External links 
 History of NATO – the Atlantic Alliance - UK Government site

Military ranks of NATO
Air force ranks